Junor is a surname. Notable people with the surname include:

Daisy Junor (1919–2012), Canadian baseball player
Eliza Junor (1804–1861), Scotswoman of mixed race who was the daughter of a former slave owner
John Junor (1919–1997), Scottish journalist
Judy Junor (born 1948), Canadian politician
Kenneth William Junor (1896–1918), Canadian World War I flying ace
Penny Junor (born 1949), English journalist and writer